The 1970 All-Ireland Under-21 Hurling Championship was the 7th staging of the All-Ireland Under-21 Hurling Championship since its establishment by the Gaelic Athletic Association in 1964.

Cork entered the championship as the defending champions.

On 1 November 1970, Cork won the championship following a 5-17 to 0-8 defeat of Wexford in a replay of the All-Ireland final. This was their 4th All-Ireland title in the grade and their third in succession.

Wexford's Mick Butler was the championship's top scorer with 6-30.

Changes

In keeping with their senior and minor teams, Galway's under-21 hurlers left the Munster Championship where they had been playing since 1964. Having no competition in their own province, Galway received a bye to the All-Ireland semi-final stage.

Results

Leinster Under-21 Hurling Championship

Quarter-finals

Semi-finals

Final

Munster Under-21 Hurling Championship

First round

Semi-finals

Final

Ulster Under-21 Hurling Championship

Final

All-Ireland Under-21 Hurling Championship

Semi-finals

Finals

Championship statistics

Top scorers

Overall

In a single game

Miscellaneous

 The All-Ireland semi-final between Wexford and Galway was their first ever championship meeting in this grade.
 Cork remained undefeated for a third successive championship.

References

Under
All-Ireland Under-21 Hurling Championship